Krybskytterne på Næsbygård is a 1966 Danish family film directed by Ib Mossin and Alice O'Fredericks.

Cast
 Asbjørn Andersen - Godsejer Martin Kaas
 Holger Juul Hansen - Pastor Johannes Pripp
 Inger Stender - Anna Pripp
 Jane Thomsen - Rosa Pripp
 Karen Berg - Helene
 Baard Owe - Thomas
 Helga Frier - Kokkepigen Marie
 Ib Mossin - Anker
 Ole Neumann - Martin
 Bertel Lauring - Karl
 Christian Arhoff - Nick

References

External links

1966 films
Danish children's films
1960s Danish-language films
Films directed by Alice O'Fredericks
Films scored by Sven Gyldmark
ASA Filmudlejning films